Anatoli Mikhailovich Melikhov is a Kazakhstani professional ice hockey coach. He coached the Barys Astana in 2003–04 season. He has also served as head coach of Kazakhstan men's national under-18 ice hockey team in 2004.

External links
Anatoli Melikhov's coaching stats at Eliteprospects.com

1943 births
Living people
Barys Astana head coaches
Kazakhstani ice hockey coaches